The nictitating membrane (from Latin nictare, to blink) is a transparent or translucent third eyelid present in some animals that can be drawn across the eye from the medial canthus to protect and moisten it while maintaining vision. All Anura(tailless amphibians), and some reptiles, birds, and sharks have full nictitating membranes; in many mammals, a small, vestigial portion of the nictitating membrane remains in the corner of the eye. Some mammals, such as cats, camels, polar bears, seals and aardvarks, have full nictitating membranes. Often called a third eyelid or haw, it may be referred to in scientific terminology as the plica semilunaris, membrana nictitans, or palpebra tertia.

Description 

The nictitating membrane is a transparent or translucent third eyelid present in some animals that can be drawn across the eye for protection and to moisten it while maintaining vision. The term comes from the Latin word nictare, meaning "to blink". It is often called a third eyelid or haw, and may be referred to in scientific terminology as the plica semilunaris, membrana nictitans, or palpebra tertia. Unlike the upper and lower eyelids, the nictitating membrane moves horizontally across the eyeball.

In many species, any stimulus to the eyeball (such as a puff of air) will result in reflex nictitating membrane response. This reflex is widely used as the basis for experiments on classical conditioning in rabbits.

Distribution 

Fully developed nictitating membranes are found in fish, amphibians, reptiles, birds and mammals, but are rare in primates. In humans, the plica semilunaris (also known as the semilunar fold) and its associated muscles are homologous to the nictitating membranes seen in some other mammals and other vertebrates. In most primate species, a plica semilunaris is generally not present, although fully developed nictitating membranes can be found in lemurs and lorisoid primates. Some mammals, such as camels, polar bears, seals and aardvarks, have full nictitating membranes, and many mammals retain a small, vestigial portion of the membrane in the corner of the eye. A gland of the third eyelid (nictitans gland) or Harder's gland is attached to the nictating membranes of some animals and may produce up to 50% of the tear film.

Functions 

The nictitating membrane is normally translucent. In some diving animals, including sea lions, it is activated on land, to remove sand and other debris—its function in most animals. In crocodiles, it protects their eyes from water but also hinders their focus under water. In some diving animals, for example beavers and manatees, it is transparent and moves across the eye to protect it while under water.

Birds can actively control their nictitating membrane. In birds of prey, the membrane also serves to protect the parents' eyes from their chicks while they are feeding them, and when peregrine falcons go into their  dives, they will blink repeatedly with their nictitating membranes to clear debris and spread moisture across the eyes. Woodpeckers tighten their nictitating membrane a millisecond prior to their beak impacting the trunk of a tree to prevent shaking-induced retinal injury.

The nictitating membrane can be used to protect the eye while attacking prey, as in sharks.

It can also protect the eye from ultraviolet radiation, similar to its role in polar bears to prevent snow blindness.

Vestigiality 

Nictitating membranes in cats and dogs do not have many muscle fibers, so they are not usually visible; chronic visibility should be taken as a sign of poor condition or ill health. The membrane can, however, be seen clearly when gently opening the eye of the healthy animal when it is asleep, or by pushing down/applying pressure on the eyeball, which will cause it to appear. In some breeds of dogs, the nictitating membrane can be prone to prolapse of the gland of the third eyelid, resulting in a condition called cherry eye.

See also 
 Accessory abducens nucleus
 Human vestigiality

References

External links 

 

Eye
Vertebrate anatomy

fi:Vilkkuluomi